William Yale may refer to:

William H. Yale (1831–1917), Minnesota lieutenant governor
Ad Yale (William M. Yale, 1870–1948), baseball player